Eckman may refer to:

People
Carol Eckman (1938–1985), an American women's basketball coach 
Charley Eckman (1921–1995), an American basketball head coach and referee
Chris Eckman of American band The Walkabouts
Dan Eckman, American director, writer, and producer
Jeannette Eckman (1882-1972)), American historian
Rena Sarah Eckman (1868–1946), American dietitian
Thomas Frederick Eckman,  victim of Charles Whitman

Places
Eckman, West Virginia

See also
Eckmann, a surname
Ekman, a surname